Nedžad Lomigora (born 27 August 1971) is a Bosnian luger. He competed in the men's singles event at the 1994 Winter Olympics.

References

External links
 

1971 births
Living people
Bosnia and Herzegovina male lugers
Olympic lugers of Bosnia and Herzegovina
Lugers at the 1994 Winter Olympics
Sportspeople from Sarajevo